Monoctenus is a genus of sawflies belonging to the family Diprionidae.

The species of this genus are found in Europe and Northern America.

Species:
 Monoctenus juniperi (Linnaeus, 1758)
 Monoctenus obscuratus (Hartig, 1837)

References

Diprionidae
Sawfly genera